Pyxichromis is a genus of haplochromine cichlids.  The species in this genus are currently included in Haplochromis by FishBase. Each species is endemic to a different Rift Valley lake in East Africa.

Species
It contains the following species:
 Pyxichromis orthostoma (Regan, 1922) 
 Pyxichromis paradoxus (Lippitsch & Kaufman, 2003)
 Pyxichromis parorthostoma (Greenwood, 1967)

References

 
Cichlid genera

Taxa named by Humphry Greenwood
Taxonomy articles created by Polbot